According to Greek mythology and legendary prehistory of the Aegean region, the Minyans or Minyae (Minyes) were an autochthonous group inhabiting the Aegean region. The extent to which the prehistory of the Aegean world is reflected in literary accounts of legendary peoples, and the degree to which material culture can be securely linked to language-based ethnicity have been subjected to repeated revision.

John L. Caskey's interpretation of his archaeological excavations conducted in the 1950s linked the ethno-linguistic "Proto-Greeks" to the bearers of the Minyan (or Middle Helladic) culture. More recent scholars have questioned or amended his dating and doubted the linking of material culture to linguistic ethnicity.

Classical Greek uses of "Minyans"

Greeks did not always clearly distinguish the Minyans from the Pelasgian cultures that had preceded them. Greek mythographers gave the Minyans an eponymous founder, Minyas, perhaps as legendary as Pelasgus (the founding father of the Pelasgians), which was a broader category of pre-Greek Aegean peoples. These Minyans were associated with Boeotian Orchomenus, as when Pausanias relates that "Teos used to be inhabited by Minyans of Orchomenus, who came to it with Athamas" and may have represented a ruling dynasty or a tribe later located in Boeotia.

Herodotus asserts several times that Pelasgians dwelt in the distant past with the Athenians in Attica, and that those Pelasgians driven from Attica in turn drove the Minyans out of Lemnos. The same historian also states that Minyans from Amyklai settled on the island of Thera in 800 BC.

Heracles, the hero whose exploits always celebrate the new Olympian order over the old traditions, came to Thebes, one of the ancient Mycenaean cities of Greece, and found that the Greeks were paying tribute of 100 cattle (a hecatomb) each year to Erginus, king of the Minyans. Heracles attacked a group of emissaries from the Minyans, and cut off their ears, noses, and hands. He then tied them around their necks and told them to take those for tribute to Erginus. Erginus made war on Thebes, but Heracles defeated the Minyans with his fellow Thebans after arming them with weapons that had been dedicated in temples. Erginus was killed and the Minyans were forced to pay double the previous tribute to the Thebans. Heracles was also credited with the burning of the palace at Orchomenus: "Then appearing unawares before the city of the Orchomenians and slipping in at their gates he burned the palace of the Minyans and razed the city to the ground."

The Argonauts were sometimes referred to as "Minyans" because Jason's mother came from that line, and several of his cousins joined in the adventure.

Archaeology

Terminology
Before World War II, archaeologists sometimes applied the term "Minyans" differently, to indicate the very first wave of Proto-Greek speakers in the 2nd millennium BCE, among the early Bronze Age cultures sometimes identified with the beginning of Middle Helladic culture. Gray "Minyan ware" is an archaeologist's term for a particular style of Aegean pottery associated with the Middle Helladic period (ca. 2100–1550 BC). More recently, however, archaeologists and palaeontologists find the term "Minyan" to be questionable: "To call the makers of Minyan ware themselves 'Minyans' is reprehensible", remarked F. H. Stubbings. "Deriving ethnic names from pottery styles is one of the most deplorable habits in archaeology," F. J. Tritsch asserted in 1974. "We cheerfully speak of the 'Minyans' when we mean a population that uses pottery we call 'Minyan'," although he was mistaken in saying that the Greeks themselves never mention the 'Minyans' as a tribe or as a people.

Excavations
When John L. Caskey of the American School of Classical Studies at Athens outlined the results of his excavations at Lerna from 1952 up until 1958, he stated that the hallmarks of Middle Helladic culture (i.e. Gray Minyan ware and the fast potter's wheel) may have originated from Early Helladic III. Caskey also stated that Lerna (along with settlements at Tiryns, Asine in the Argolid, Agios Kosmas near Athens, and perhaps Corinth) was destroyed at the end of Early Helladic II. He suggested that the invaders of Early Helladic II settlements may have been Greeks speaking a prototype of the later Greek language. However, there is evidence of destruction at the end of the Early Helladic III period at Korakou (near Corinth) and Eutresis in Boeotia. Nevertheless, Caskey found the Middle Helladic people to be the direct ancestors of the Myceneans and later Greeks.

Although scholars today agree that the Mycenean Greeks descend from the "Minyans" of the Middle Helladic period, they question Caskey's suggestion that (proto-Greek) Indo-European invaders destroyed Early Helladic II settlements throughout Greece. In fact, the layers of destruction Caskey found at Lerna and Tiryns were ultimately attributed to fire. Moreover, there are indications of Early Helladic II culture being directly succeeded by Early Helladic III culture. Overall, this indicates that the progenitors and founders of "Minyan culture" were an autochthonous group.

See also
 Graïke
 Graia
 Ogyges
 Pelasgians
 Pre-Greek substrate
 Chloris
 Persephone

Notes

References

Citations

Sources

 Apollonius of Rhodes, Apollonius Rhodius: the Argonautica, translated by Robert Cooper Seaton, W. Heinemann, 1912. Internet Archive.

External links
 Harper's Dictionary of Classical Antiquities
 Peter Pavúk - "Grey Ware as a Phenomenon" (Aegeo-Balkan Prehistory)

Legendary tribes in Greco-Roman historiography
Helladic civilization
Ancient tribes in Boeotia